Rosewater railway station was a railway station located in the northwestern Adelaide suburb of Rosewater.

History 

The station opened in 1916, along with the Rosewater Loop.

The station consisted merely of a shelter and a 2-metre-long step-down platform. When the Dry Creek to Port Adelaide line closed to passengers on 29 May 1988, Rosewater was one of two stations to operate until the line's closure (the other being Junction Road station), because the stations east of Junction Road station closed in 1987. The platform and shelter were removed shortly after, and there is no evidence of the station left.

See also 
Dry Creek-Port Adelaide railway
List of closed Adelaide railway stations

References

Disused railway stations in South Australia
Railway stations in Australia opened in 1916
Railway stations closed in 1988